KDYR may refer to:

 KDYR (FM), a radio station (90.9 FM) licensed to serve Dyer, Nevada, United States; see List of radio stations in Nevada
 Dyersburg Regional Airport (ICAO code KDYR)